Harpalus procognatus is a species of ground beetle in the subfamily Harpalinae. It was described by Lorenz in 1998.

References

procognatus
Beetles described in 1998